Evelina Galo is a Croatian former handball player.

She has been credited as one of the greatest players in Yugoslavia's history.

Biography
Galo was born in Labin, Istria (today Croatia, then Yugoslavia). She started playing for her hometown club, ŽRK Rudar Labin.

She played as a regular for Yugoslavia women's A national team. With Yugoslavia, Galo took part in several international competitions, including the 1978 World Championship in Czechoslovakia. She played a total of 35 games for Yugoslavia.

She was a valuable player for Yugoslavia, and today is regarded as ŽRK Rudar Labin's greatest player of all time.

References

Croatian female handball players
Yugoslav female handball players
Year of birth missing (living people)
Living people
People from Labin